Cortinarius trivialis is a species of inedible fungus in the genus Cortinarius.

The gills are adnate or adnexed, grayish blue turning brown as the spores mature.

It was reported as edible as recently as 1991, but European field guides consider it poisonous. It should not be consumed due to its similarity to deadly poisonous species.

Similar species include and Cortinarius cliduchus and C. collinitus.

References

trivialis
Fungi of Europe
Fungi described in 1940
Inedible fungi